Josiane Shen is a former Luxembourgish television presenter.

Career 
Having earned a degree in journalism, Shen spent her entire career as a television presenter with Télé-Luxembourg.

Shen is best remembered for accidentally greeting the United Kingdom during the voting procedure with "Good night, London", instead of "Good evening, London", to which the British spokesperson, Michael Aspel, replied "Good morning, Luxembourg".

She also co-hosted two editions of the short-lived Grand Prix RTL International in 1970 and 1971.

Filmography

Television

See also
List of Eurovision Song Contest presenters

References

External links 
 

Living people
Luxembourgian television personalities
Year of birth missing (living people)
Music journalists